Ulf Göran Hagberg (born 8 November 1947) is a Swedish former footballer who played as a goalkeeper.

Club career 
During his club career Hagberg played for Landskrona BoIS, Östers IF, Alvesta GIF, AIK and Ljungby IF between 1966 and 1983.

International career 
Hagberg played 15 international games for Sweden, and participated in the 1974 and 1978 FIFA World Cups in West Germany respectively Argentina.

Honours 
Östers IF

 Allsvenskan: 1978
 Svenska Cupen: 1976–77

References

External links

1947 births
Living people
Association football goalkeepers
Swedish footballers
Sweden international footballers
1974 FIFA World Cup players
1978 FIFA World Cup players
Allsvenskan players
Landskrona BoIS players
Östers IF players
AIK Fotboll players